Hutchinson's triad is named after Sir Jonathan Hutchinson (1828–1913). It is a common pattern of presentation for congenital syphilis, and consists of three phenomena:  interstitial keratitis, malformed teeth (Hutchinson incisors and mulberry molars), and eighth nerve deafness. There may also be a deformity on the nose known as saddle nose deformity.

References 

Infectious diseases
Pediatrics
Syphilis
Medical triads